Twelve national teams competed in the women's field hockey tournament at the 2008 Summer Olympics in Beijing, China. Sixteen players were officially enrolled in each team. Two reserve players could also be nominated to be available should a player enrolled in the official team become injured during the tournament. Official team rosters were released by the FIH on 24 July 2008.

Pool A

Australia
The following is the Australian roster in the women's field hockey tournament of the 2008 Summer Olympics.

Head Coach: Frank Murray

Casey Eastham
Megan Rivers
Kim Walker
Kate Hollywood
Emily Halliday
Madonna Blyth
Nicole Arrold
Kobie McGurk
Fiona Johnson
Rachel Imison (GK)
Angie Skirving
Melanie Twitt (c)
Hope Munro
Teneal Attard
Sarah Taylor
Nikki Hudson (c)

Reserve:
Toni Cronk (GK)
Shelly Liddelow

Notes

China
The following is the Chinese roster in the women's field hockey tournament of the 2008 Summer Olympics.

Head Coach: Kim Chang-Back

Ma Yibo (c)
Chen Zhaoxia
Cheng Hui
Huang Junxia
Fu Baorong
Li Shuang
Gao Lihua
Tang Chunling
Zhou Wanfeng
Zhang Yimeng (GK)
Li Hongxia
Ren Ye
Chen Qiuqi
Zhao Yudiao
Song Qingling
Pan Fengzhen (GK)

Reserve:
Sun Zhen
Li Aili

Netherlands
The following is the Dutch roster in the women's field hockey tournament of the 2008 Summer Olympics.

Head Coach: Marc Lammers

Lisanne de Roever (GK)
Eefke Mulder
Fatima Moreira de Melo
Miek van Geenhuizen
Wieke Dijkstra
Maartje Goderie
Lidewij Welten
Minke Smabers
Minke Booij (c)
Janneke Schopman
Maartje Paumen
Naomi van As
Ellen Hoog
Sophie Polkamp
Eva de Goede
Marilyn Agliotti

Reserve:
Kelly Jonker
Floortje Engels (GK)

South Africa
The following is the South African roster in the women's field hockey tournament of the 2008 Summer Olympics.

Head Coach: Jennifer King

Mariette Rix (GK)
Vuyisanani Mangisa (GK)
Kate Hector
Taryn Hosking
Cindy Brown
Marsha Marescia (c)
Shelley Russell
Lisa-Marie Deetlefs
Jenny Wilson
Lesle-Ann George
Vida Ryan
Vidette Ryan
Lenise Marais
Kathleen Taylor
Fiona Butler
Tarryn Bright

Reserve:
Henriette du Buisson
<li value=23>Farrah Fredericks

South Korea
The following is the South Korean roster in the women's field hockey tournament of the 2008 Summer Olympics.

Head Coach: Han Jin-soo

Moon Young-hui (GK)
<li value=3>Cho Hye-sook
<li value=5>Kim Young-ran
<li value=7>Lee Seon-ok (c)
Kim Jung-hee
Park Mi-hyun
Kim Jin-kyoung
Kim Mi-seon
<li value=12>Kim Jong-eun
<li value=14>Eum Mi-young
Gim Sung-hee
<li value=17>Seo Hye-jin
Park Jeong-sook
Kim Eun-sil
<li value=22>Kim Da-rae
Han Hye-lyoung

Reserve:
<li value=2>Lim Seon-mee
<li value=16>Lee Soo-jin (GK)

Spain
The following is the Spanish roster in the women's field hockey tournament of the 2008 Summer Olympics.

Head Coach: Pablo Usoz

María Jesús Rosa (GK)
Julia Menéndez
Rocío Ybarra
<li value=7>Bárbara Malda
<li value=9>Silvia Muñoz (c)
Silvia Bonastre
María Romagosa
Marta Ejarque
<li value=13>Raquel Huertas
Pilar Sánchez
<li value=17>Núria Camón
<li value=19>María Lopéz (GK)
Montse Cruz
Esther Termens
Gloria Comerma
Georgina Olivia

Reserve:
<li value=5>Paula Paula
<li value=8>Panadero Yurena

Pool B

Argentina
The following is the Argentine roster in the women's field hockey tournament of the 2008 Summer Olympics.

Head Coach: Gabriel Minadeo

Belén Succi (GK)
<li value=3>Magdalena Aicega (c)
Rosario Luchetti
<li value=7>Alejandra Gulla
Luciana Aymar
<li value=10>Agustina García
Carla Rebecchi
Mariana González Oliva
<li value=14>Mercedes Margalot
María de la Paz Hernández
Mariana Rossi
<li value=18>Paola Vukojicic (GK)
Mariné Russo
<li value=24>Claudia Burkart
<li value=26>Giselle Kañevsky
Noel Barrionuevo

Reserve:
<li value=9>Silvina D'Elía
<li value=25>Agustina Bouza

Germany
The following is the German roster in the women's field hockey tournament of the 2008 Summer Olympics.

Head Coach: Michael Behrmann

<li value=2>Tina Bachmann
<li value=4>Mandy Haase
<li value=7>Natascha Keller
<li value=9>Martina Heinlein
<li value=11>Eileen Hoffmann
<li value=13>Marion Rodewald (c)
Katharina Scholz
<li value=16>Fanny Rinne
<li value=18>Anke Kühn
<li value=22>Janine Beermann
<li value=24>Maike Stöckel
Janne Müller-Wieland
Christina Schütze
Pia Eidmann
Julia Müller
<li value=32>Kristina Reynolds (GK)

Reserve:
Yvonne Frank
<li value=29>Lina Geyer

Great Britain
The following is the British roster in the women's field hockey tournament of the 2008 Summer Olympics.

Head Coach: Danny Kerry

<li value=2>Beth Storry (GK)
Lisa Wooding
Anne Panter
Crista Cullen
Melanie Clewlow
Charlotte Craddock
Helen Richardson
Joanne Ellis
<li value=10>Lucilla Wright
Kate Walsh (c)
Chloe Rogers
Jennie Bimson
Rachel Walker
Alex Danson
<li value=18>Sarah Thomas
<li value=22>Jo Ellis

Reserve:
Katy Roberts (GK)
<li value=19>Laura Barlett

Japan
The following is the Japanese roster in the women's field hockey tournament of the 2008 Summer Olympics.

Head Coach: Yoo Seung-Jin

Ikuko Okamura (GK)
Keiko Miura
<li value=4>Mayumi Ono
Chie Kimura
Rika Komazawa
Miyuki Nakagawa
Sakae Morimoto
Kaori Chiba
<li value=10>Yukari Yamamoto
Toshie Tsukui
<li value=13>Sachimi Iwao
Akemi Kato (c)
Tomomi Komori
<li value=18>Misaki Ozawa
<li value=20>Chinami Kozakura
<li value=22>Yuka Yoshikawa (GK)

Reserve:
<li value=3>Hikari Suwa
<li value=19>Nichika Urata

New Zealand
The following is the New Zealand roster in the women's field hockey tournament of the 2008 Summer Olympics.

Head Coach: Kevin Towns

Kayla Sharland
Emily Naylor
Krystal Forgesson
Kate Saunders
<li value=8>Jaimee Claxton
<li value=10>Lizzy Igasan (c)
Stacey Carr
<li value=13>Jo Galletly
<li value=14>Kim Noakes
Beth Jurgeleit (GK)
<li value=17>Caryn Paewai
<li value=21>Niniwa Roberts
Gemma Flynn
Tara Drysdale
Sheree Horvath
<li value=26>Anita Wawatai (GK)

Reserve:
<li value=28>Charlotte Harrison
Jasmine McQuinn

United States
The following is the American roster in the women's field hockey tournament of the 2008 Summer Olympics.

Head Coach: Lee Bodimeade

[[Angela Loy]]
[[Kelly Doton]]
<li value=7>[[Jesse Gey]]
[[Rachel Dawson]]
<li value=10>[[Tiffany Snow]]
<li value=13>[[Keli Smith]]
<li value=15>[[Dana Sensenig]]
<li value=17>[[Carrie Lingo]]
<li value=19>[[Caroline Nichols]]
<li value=22>[[Kate Barber]] ([[Captain (sports)|c]])
[[Katelyn Falgowski]]
[[Dina Rizzo]]
[[Amy Tran]] ([[Goalkeeper (field hockey)|GK]])
[[Kayla Bashore]]
[[Lauren Crandall]]
[[Lauren Powley]]
{{div col end}}

Reserve:
<li value=11>[[Sara Silvetti]]
<li value=16>[[Barbara Weinberg]] ([[Goalkeeper (field hockey)|GK]])<section end=USA />

References
{{reflist}}

{{Field hockey at the Summer Olympics}}

[[Category:Field hockey players at the 2008 Summer Olympics|*]]
[[Category:Field hockey at the 2008 Summer Olympics – Women's tournament|Squads]]
[[Category:Women's Olympic field hockey squads|2008]]